Jeffrey Neale Jackson (born September 12, 1982) is an American politician, attorney, and military officer serving as the U.S. representative for North Carolina's 14th congressional district since 2023. He represented the 37th district in the North Carolina Senate from 2014 to 2022.

After graduating from law school, Jackson worked as an assistant district attorney in Gaston County; he is of counsel at Womble Bond Dickinson. In 2002, Jackson enlisted in the United States Army Reserve and served in the Kandahar Province during the War in Afghanistan. He now serves in the Judge Advocate General's Corps with the Army National Guard.

On February 25, 2022, Jackson announced his candidacy for the U.S. House of Representatives in North Carolina's new 14th congressional district. He won the general election.

Early life
Jackson was born in Miami, Florida, on September 12, 1982, and raised in Chapel Hill, North Carolina. His father, Nathan Jackson, is a doctor, and his mother is a nurse. Jackson earned a bachelor's degree and a master's degree in philosophy from Emory University. He also earned a Juris Doctor degree from the University of North Carolina School of Law.

Jackson signed up for the United States Army Reserve in 2002. He works as a business litigator at Womble Bond Dickinson in Charlotte. Jackson also continues to serve in the North Carolina Army National Guard as a major in the Judge Advocate General's Corps.

Before joining the North Carolina Senate, Jackson worked as a prosecutor in Gaston County, North Carolina. He resigned upon joining the Senate, as the state constitution prohibits serving as an elected official and a prosecutor simultaneously.

North Carolina Senate 
When Senator Dan Clodfelter resigned to become mayor of Charlotte in 2014, his State Senate seat had to be filled by local Democratic precinct members. Jackson and three other candidates sought the office. Of 49 votes, Jackson received 25, winning by one vote. Jackson was also chosen to replace Clodfelter as the Democratic nominee in the November 2014 general election. Because no one else filed to run against Clodfelter, Jackson ran unopposed for a full two-year term. He was reelected to a second full term in 2016 with 68% of the vote against Bob Diamond.

Jackson gained national attention when he was the only legislator to show up for work on a snow day in February 2015.

He supports significantly expanding pre-K education programs. In 2017, Jackson introduced a bill to repeal the Public Facilities Privacy & Security Act, also known as HB2.

Under previous North Carolina law, women could not legally revoke their consent to engage in sexual intercourse once that act has consensually begun, meaning that, according to Jackson, North Carolina was "the only state in the country where no doesn't really mean no". After several years of introducing a bill to close the consent loophole, it passed unanimously in 2019.

Jackson faced his first competitive race in 2020. His district had been significantly redrawn and was now a D+2 district, in which a Democratic candidate would be expected to win by two points. Jackson was called up for National Guard duty during the final weeks of his campaign, so his wife, Marisa, became the face of the campaign for the closing weeks. Jackson won the election with 55% of the vote.

2022 U.S. Senate campaign

Various news outlets mentioned Jackson as a potential candidate against Republican incumbent Richard Burr in North Carolina's 2016 U.S. Senate election. Jackson declined to run and Burr was reelected. He was also mentioned as a potential challenger to North Carolina's other U.S. senator, Thom Tillis, in 2020.

On January 26, 2021, Jackson announced he would run to replace Burr, who was retiring, in North Carolina's 2022 United States Senate election. He announced that he would run a "100-county campaign", visiting all of North Carolina's 100 counties. His campaign raised over $500,000 within 48 hours of his announcement. Jackson raised more than $900,000 in the third quarter of 2021, and in total more than $3 million from the time he announced his candidacy in January 2021.

On December 16, 2021, Jackson announced that he would suspend his campaign and endorsed Cheri Beasley.

U.S. House of Representatives

2022 election 

Following redistricting, Jackson announced his candidacy for the U.S. House of Representatives in the state's new 14th congressional district on February 25, 2022. The district includes most of the southern half of Mecklenburg County, as well as eastern Gaston County.

Jackson won the general election, defeating Republican nominee Pat Harrigan with nearly 58% of the vote. When he took office in 2023, he was the first white Democrat to represent a significant portion of Charlotte in 70 years. Most of the Mecklenburg County portion of the 14th had long been part of the 9th district, whose various permutations had been in Republican hands since 1953.

Tenure 
After taking office, Jackson garnered attention with his TikTok account, which he uses to explain major issues and how Congress works. As of March 2023, he has 1.3 million followers.

Committee memberships 
Jackson serves on the United States House Committee on Armed Services and the United States House Committee on Science, Space, and Technology. In the Armed Services committee, he serves on the subcommittees for Intelligence and Special Operations and Tactical Air and Land Forces. In the Science, Space, and Technology committee, he serves on the subcommittees for Space and Aeronautics and Investigations and Oversight.

Caucus memberships 

 New Democrat Coalition
 The Equality Caucus

Personal life 
Jackson is married to Marisa Jackson, a marketing director. They have three children. In 2020, Jackson was named one of Charlotte Magazine Charlotteans of the Year.

Electoral history

References

External links

 Congressman explains bank failures
 Congressman Jeff Jackson official U.S. House website
 Jeff Jackson for Congress campaign website

 

|-

|-

1982 births
21st-century American lawyers
21st-century American politicians
American TikTokers
Democratic Party North Carolina state senators
Democratic Party members of the United States House of Representatives from North Carolina
Emory University alumni
Living people
North Carolina lawyers
People from Chapel Hill, North Carolina
United States Army Judge Advocate General's Corps
United States Army officers
University of North Carolina School of Law alumni